Matúš Körös (born 17 November 2003) is a Slovak footballer who plays for Dukla Banská Bystrica as a midfielder.

Club career
Körös made his Fortuna Liga debut for MFK Dukla Banská Bystrica against FC DAC 1904 Dunajská Streda on 14 August 2022.

References

External links
 MFK Dukla Banská Bystrica official club profile 
 Futbalnet profile 
 
 

2003 births
Living people
Slovak footballers
Association football midfielders
MFK Dukla Banská Bystrica players
MFK Dolný Kubín players
Slovak Super Liga players
2. Liga (Slovakia) players